Ringu (the Japanese romanization of ring) may refer to:
Ring (franchise)
Ring (novel series)
Ring (Suzuki novel) published in 1991
Ring (film) the 1998 adaptation of the above novel
Ringu Ringu language